Miloud Rahmani (born 30 December 1982) is an Algerian athlete specialsing in the 400 metres hurdles. He represented his country at the 2016 Olympic Games as well as the 2013 and 2015 World Champinoships without qualifying for the semifinals.

His personal best in the event is 49.34 seconds set in Mersin in 2013. His personal best over the flat 400 metres is 46.57 seconds set in Algiers in 2007.

Competition record

References

1982 births
Living people
Algerian male hurdlers
World Athletics Championships athletes for Algeria
Athletes (track and field) at the 2015 African Games
Athletes (track and field) at the 2016 Summer Olympics
Olympic athletes of Algeria
African Games silver medalists for Algeria
African Games medalists in athletics (track and field)
African Games bronze medalists for Algeria
Mediterranean Games silver medalists for Algeria
Mediterranean Games medalists in athletics
Athletes (track and field) at the 2013 Mediterranean Games
Competitors at the 2009 Summer Universiade
21st-century Algerian people